Wolf 489 (WD 1334+039, LHS 46, G 062-053, Gliese 518) is a nearby degenerate star (white dwarf) of spectral class DZ10.0), the single known component of the system, located in the constellation Virgo.

Distance

Wolf 489, probably, is the 12th closest white dwarf, or, possibly, 9th–14th (see Gliese 293, GJ 1087, Gliese 915, GJ 1276 and Gliese 318). Its trigonometric parallax from YPC (Yale Parallax Catalog) is 121.4 ± 3.4 mas, corresponding to a distance 8.24 ± 0.23 pc, or 26.87 ± 0.75 ly.

Physical parameters

Wolf 489's mass is 0.55 ± 0.03 Solar masses, its surface gravity is 107.95 ± 0.02 (8.91 · 107) cm·s−2, or approximately 91 000 of Earth's, corresponding to a radius 9089 km, or 143% of Earth's.

Wolf 489's temperature is 5030 ± 120 K (comparable with that of early K-type main sequence stars); its cooling age, i. e. age as degenerate star (not including lifetime as main sequence star and as giant star) is 5.19 Gyr. Wolf 489 and should appear white with a slight shade of yellow, nealy the same color as a K-type main sequence star.

Notes

See also
 List of star systems within 25–30 light-years

References

White dwarfs
Virgo (constellation)
0518
J13363181+0340458